Alice In... is an indie industrial-oriented record label based in Hesse, Germany.

History
Alice In... was founded in the early nineties by Frank D'Angelo. Its first signings were in 1995 with the bands The Hall of Souls, Misantrophe, No Critics, and Babylon Will Fall. Parallel to the publications of German Newcomer, Alice In... had made a narrow collaboration with English record labels, like Resurrection Records and Grave News. Inkubus Sukkubus, Sensorium, and This Burning Effigy, among others were also signed to Alice In...  The first official Alice In... release, was No Critics' Prayers Behind the Door.  Then, the label released Misantrophe's "Der Tod zerfraß die Kindlichkeit".

Alice In..., as well as Schwarzrock, SCANNER and ProNoize are sub-labels of Dark Dimensions label group.

Later releases include work by Stillste Stund and by Bloody Dead And Sexy.

In 1997, the label signed a distribution deal with Nova Media Distribution.

Notable artists (past and present)
 Bloody Dead And Sexy
 Corpus Delicti
 Diva Destruction
 Empyrean
 Hatesex
 Inkubus Sukkubus
 Kiss The Blade
 Mephisto Walz
 Mondsucht
 Monica Richards
 Nekromantik
 Relatives Menschsein
 Sensorium
 Shadow Project
 Stillste Stund
 Sunshine Blind
 Suspiria
 The Last Days Of Jesus

See also 
 Category:Alice In... albums
 List of record labels

External links
 Official site (in German only)
 Alice In... {on MySpace}

German record labels
Goth record labels